Abule Egba is a neighborhood in Lagos, Nigeria. Abule egba are under Alimosho LGA of Lagos. The neighborhood was the site of a petroleum pipeline explosion, the 2006 Abule Egba pipeline explosion, which occurred on December 26, 2006. In 2016, the Lagos Government began construction of a flyover in the neighbourhood to ease the traffic caused by millions of persons plying its road on a daily basis. The bridge was completed and commissioned in May, 2017.

Gallery

References

Neighborhoods of Lagos